Carita Veronica Boulwén (born 6 September, 1967) is a Swedish politician of the Sweden Democrats party who has been a member of the Riksdag since 2022, representing the Halland County constituency.

Boulwén has served as the spokeswoman for the Sweden Democrats in Kungsbacka, where she is also municipal councilor and the group leader for the party on the municipal council. She has also served as the local spokeswoman on health, child care and labour issues for the SD. For the 2022 Swedish general election, she was selected by the SD to lead the party's Riksdag candidate list for the Halland county electoral list. During her campaign, she focused on increasing the number of police officers in the constituency and for changes to Sweden's asylum system, arguing that aid should be given to refugee camps near war zones rather than maintaining a policy which she claims encourages refugees to migrate illegally to Sweden. Boulwén was subsequently elected to the Riksdag, taking a seat from the Left Party.

See also 

 List of members of the Riksdag, 2022–2026

References 

1967 births
Members of the Riksdag from the Sweden Democrats
21st-century Swedish politicians
21st-century Swedish women politicians
Women members of the Riksdag
Living people
Members of the Riksdag 2022–2026